A Weck jar is a glass jar used in home canning to preserve food. It has a rubber gasket with a glass lid.

History
The jars were invented and patented by Rudolph Rempel. Johann Carl Weck purchased the patent from Rempel, and in 1900 Weck and his best salesman George Van Eyck founded the J. WECK Company in Germany. In 1902, Weck left the company, Van Eyck continued to improve the design and function of the jar, and started exporting the jars outside of Germany. He trademarked the name WECK and his strawberry logo is still used today.

The jar
The glass jars come in a variety of shapes and sizes, have rubber seals, glass lids, and stainless steel clips.

Food is processed in Weck jars using the water bath canning technique, not a pressure canner. During the canning process the lids are secured by the clips which must be removed once the processing is complete and the jars have cooled. A correctly sealed jar is indicated when the tab of the rubber seal points downward. New rubber seals should be used each time food is processed.

See also
Home canning
Sterilization (microbiology)
Other canning jar types/brands:
Fowler's Vacola
Kilner jar
Mason jar

References

External links
 (US)
 (DE)

Glass jars
Canned food
Food storage containers